The 1920 Stratford by-election was a by-election during the 20th New Zealand Parliament for the rural Taranaki seat of . The by-election was called following the previous election being declared void, invalidating the preceding 1919 general election results. It was held on  6 May 1920.

Candidates
Only two candidates contested the seat. Robert Masters (Liberal Party), who had previously taken the seat off the incumbent John Bird Hine (Reform Party).

Result
The following table gives the election results:

Notes

References

Stratford 1920
1920 elections in New Zealand
Politics of Taranaki